The Palmyra New York Temple is the 77th operating temple of the Church of Jesus Christ of Latter-day Saints (LDS Church).

The site for the Palmyra New York Temple, atop a wooded hill in pastoral western New York, is in an area prominent in the early history of the Latter Day Saint movement. Nearby is the grove of trees known as the Sacred Grove in which the founder and first prophet of the church, Joseph Smith, reported having a vision in which he saw God the Father and Jesus Christ, an event known as the First Vision. The temple grounds, on the border between the towns of Manchester and Palmyra, are also on the grounds of the original Smith Family Farm. The church itself was organized thirty miles away in Fayette, New York in 1830.

History
At the groundbreaking ceremony, held May 25, 1999, LDS Church president Gordon B. Hinckley commented on the area's rich history, saying that it was in that locale that Mormonism truly began. Hinckley also marveled at how much the church had grown since its founding in 1830.

Local reaction to the new temple was positive and more than 30,700 visitors toured the new temple before its dedication. The temple serves about 18,000 members within seven stakes. The Palmyra New York Temple was dedicated on  April 6, 2000, the 170th anniversary of the organization of the church. While only about 1,200 members attended the dedicatory sessions within the temple itself nearly 1.5 million members took part through media broadcasts throughout the United States and Canada.

The exterior is white marble. Forty art glass windows inside the temple depict local events in LDS Church history. A gold statue of the angel Moroni tops the single spire. Ornate carved cherry wood railings, wainscoting, and moldings line the halls, along with hand-sculpted carpeting.

In 2020, the Palmyra New York Temple was closed in response to the coronavirus pandemic.

Gallery

See also

 Comparison of temples of The Church of Jesus Christ of Latter-day Saints
 List of temples of The Church of Jesus Christ of Latter-day Saints
 List of temples of The Church of Jesus Christ of Latter-day Saints by geographic region
 Temple architecture (Latter-day Saints)

References

Further reading

External links

Palmyra New York Temple Official site
Palmyra New York Temple at ChurchofJesusChristTemples.org

20th-century Latter Day Saint temples
Buildings and structures in Ontario County, New York 
Buildings and structures in Wayne County, New York 
Latter Day Saint movement in New York (state)
Religious buildings and structures in New York (state)
Temples (LDS Church) completed in 2000
Temples (LDS Church) in the United States
2000 establishments in New York (state)